Durum wheat, also called pasta wheat or macaroni wheat (Triticum durum or Triticum turgidum subsp. durum), is a tetraploid species of wheat. It is the second most cultivated species of wheat after common wheat, although it represents only 5% to 8% of global wheat production. It was developed by artificial selection of the domesticated emmer wheat strains formerly grown in Central Europe and the Near East around 7000 BC, which developed a naked, free-threshing form.  Like emmer, durum wheat is awned (with bristles). It is the predominant wheat that grows in the Middle East.

Durum in Latin means "hard", and the species is the hardest of all wheats. This refers to the resistance of the grain to milling, in particular of the starchy endosperm, implying dough made from its flour is weak or "soft". This makes durum favorable for semolina and pasta and less practical for flour, which requires more work than with hexaploid wheats like common bread wheats. Despite its high protein content, durum is not a strong wheat in the sense of giving strength to dough through the formation of a gluten network. Durum contains 27% extractable wet gluten, about 3% higher than in common wheat (T. aestivum L.).

Genealogy
Durum wheat is a tetraploid wheat, having 4 sets of chromosomes for a total of 28, unlike hard red winter and hard red spring wheats, which are hexaploid (6 sets of chromosomes) for a total of 42 chromosomes each.

Durum wheat originated through intergeneric hybridization and polyploidization involving two diploid (having 2 sets of chromosomes) grass species: T. urartu (2n=2x=14, AA genome) and a B-genome diploid related to Aegilops speltoides (2n=2x=14, SS genome) and is thus an allotetraploid (having 4 sets of chromosomes, from unlike parents) species.

Uses
Commercially produced dry pasta, or pasta secca, is made almost exclusively from durum semolina.  Most home made fresh pastas (pasta fresca), such as orecchiette and tagliatelle, also use durum wheat or a combination of soft and hard wheats.

Husked but unground, or coarsely ground, it is used to produce the semolina in the couscous of North Africa and the Levant. It is also used for Levantine dishes such as tabbouleh, kashk, kibbeh, bitfun and the bulgur for pilafs. In North African cuisine and Levantine cuisine, it forms the basis of many soups, gruels, stuffings, puddings and pastries.  When ground as fine as flour, it is used for making bread. In the Middle East, it is used for flat round breads, and in Europe and elsewhere, it can be used for pizza or torte. Couscous is a North African dish made from small, boiled balls of durum wheat.

The use of wheat to produce pasta was described as early as the 10th century by Ibn Wahshīya of Cairo. The North Africans called the product itrīya, from which Italian sources derived the term tria (or aletría in the case of Spanish sources) during the 15th century.

Production
Most of the durum grown today is amber durum, the grains of which are amber-colored due to the extra carotenoid pigments and are larger than those of other types of wheat. Durum has a yellow endosperm, which gives pasta its color. When durum is milled, the endosperm is ground into a granular product called semolina. Semolina made from durum is used for premium pastas and breads. Notably semolina is also one of the only flours that is purposely oxidized for flavor and color. There is also a red durum, used mostly for livestock feed.

The cultivation of durum generates greater yield than other wheats in areas of low precipitation (3–5 dm). Good yields can be obtained by irrigation, but this is rarely done. In the first half of the 20th century, the crop was widely grown in Russia. Durum is one of the most important food crops in West Asia. Although the variety of the wheat there is diverse, it is not extensively grown there, and thus must be imported.  West amber durum produced in Canada is used mostly as semolina/pasta, but some is also exported to Italy for bread production.

In the Middle East and North Africa, local bread-making accounts for half the consumption of durum. Some flour is even imported. On the other hand, many countries in Europe produce durum in commercially significant quantities.

In India durum accounts for roughly 5% of total wheat production in the country, and is used to make products such as rava and sooji.

Production of wheat 2017/2018

Processing and protein content
Durum wheat is subject to four processes: cleaning, tempering, milling and purifying. First, durum wheat is cleaned to remove foreign material and shrunken and broken kernels. Then it is tempered to a moisture content, toughening the seed coat for efficient separation of bran and endosperm. Durum milling is a complex procedure involving repetitive grinding and sieving. Proper purifying results in maximum semolina yield and the least amount of bran powder.

To produce bread, durum wheat is ground into flour. The flour is mixed with water to produce dough. The quantities mixed vary, depending on the acidity of the mixture. To produce fluffy bread, the dough is mixed with yeast and lukewarm water, heavily kneaded to form a gas-retaining gluten network, and then fermented for hours, producing  bubbles.

The quality of the bread produced depends on the viscoelastic properties of gluten, the protein content and protein composition. Containing about 12% total protein in defatted flour compared to 11% in common wheat, durum wheat yields 27% extractable, wet gluten compared to 24% in common wheat.

Health concerns

Because durum wheat contains gluten, it is unsuitable for people with gluten-related disorders such as celiac disease, non-celiac gluten sensitivity and wheat allergy.

References

Sources

Further reading

 .
 .

External links

 Durum Wheat Research, Grain Research Laboratory, Canadian Grain Commission

Middle Eastern cuisine
Wheat
Taxa named by René Louiche Desfontaines